The Torneo de las Naciones (Nations Tournament) is a friendly basketball tournament held in Spain co-organized by the basketball federations of Basque Country, Catalonia and Galicia. This three regional teams participate each year in a Final Four format with an invited national team.

The players in the tournament are not identified with the Spain men's national basketball team, and the invited teams usually do not participate with their best players.

Champions

Results

I Copa de las Naciones 2008

II Copa de las Naciones 2009

III Copa de las Naciones 2010

Notes

Basketball cup competitions in Spain